Solar United Neighbors (SUN) is an American nonprofit organization that arranges solar co-ops for group purchase of home solar panel installations.

History 

The organization had its beginnings in 2007 when Walter Schoolman and his friend Diego Arene-Morley, both aged 12, watched the film An Inconvenient Truth. Following this, they  asked their respective parents to install solar panels on their homes. Walter's mother, Anya Schoolman helped the two boys to found the  Mt. Pleasant Solar Cooperative after their request and after discovering the high cost of retail solar installations. As a group, they convinced some of their neighbors to join together to increase their buying power for solar installations. The initial group had by 2009 installed solar panels for 45 homes in Washington D.C.’s Mt. Pleasant neighborhood.

In 2011 Anya Schoolman founded the national organization that would become Solar United Neighbors.

In 2018, SUN partnered with the American Solar Energy Society (ASES) in support of the US National Solar Tour, a tour of operational solar systems. 

By March 2021, the effort had installed solar panels for 5,200 homes in the United States.

Advocacy
Observers have noted that Solar United Neighbors seeks to influence government policy affecting solar panel installations and to install solar panels in ways that are socially just. 

In 2021 SUN joined with the Institute for Local Self-Reliance and the Initiative for Energy Justice in the 30 Million Solar Homes campaign.

Locations
SUN is active in multiple states including Texas, Colorado, Virginia, Indiana, Ohio and Florida.

Projects in some states, such as the Sunnyside Energy Community Solar project in Houston, offer resilience during extreme weather events.

References 

Renewable energy
Renewable energy policy in the United States
Renewable energy economy
Solar power in the United States
American companies established in 2007